Andrea Brett Morrison Bronfman (May 30, 1945 – January 23, 2006) was a philanthropist and wife of billionaire Charles Bronfman, who was once co-chairman of Seagram's Co.

Personal life
She was born Andrea Brett Morrison in 1945 to a British Jewish family in London, the daughter of Hyam and Doris Morrison. Her father led the United Joint Israel Appeal, and her mother founded the British Friends of the Museums of Israel.

She moved to Canada as a young bride with her first husband, David Cohen, (the grandson of Lyon Cohen, a prominent businessman, philanthropist, and founder of the Canadian Jewish Congress and the "Jewish Times", the first Canadian Jewish newspaper). (David Cohen was the first cousin of singer Leonard Cohen.) After that marriage ended in divorce, she married Charles Bronfman, who had served as best man at her marriage to Cohen.

The Andrea M. Bronfman Prize for the Arts is given annually in her honour.

Death
She died in 2006 after being hit by a taxi in Central Park. A letter of condolence from  the World Jewish Congress, whose president was her brother-in-law, Edgar Bronfman Sr., called Bronfman a pillar of her family and of the Jewish community.

She is survived by her children with David Cohen (died 2010):
Jeremy Cohen, and his wife Marci 
Philippa "Pippa" Cohen, the founder of the artist management firm Webbcreative
Anthony "Tony" Cohen, the President and CEO of Global Edge Investments, a hospitality and lifestyle based investment company he founded in 1998, and his wife Moira

A memorial ceremony was held Congregation B'nai Jeshurun in Manhattan and she was buried in Jerusalem.

Philanthropy
Andrea Bronfman and her husband were active in numerous charities including:
Andrea and Charles Bronfman Philanthropies
Gift of New York, a charity put together after the September 11, 2001 attacks on the United States.

See also
Bronfman family

References

External links 
 Andrea Bronfman Killed in Car Accident
 Andrea Morrison Bronfman; active in Jewish causes; 60

1945 births
2006 deaths
Andrea Bronfman
Road incident deaths in New York City
English expatriates in Canada
English Jews
Jewish American philanthropists
Jewish Canadian philanthropists
American people of British-Jewish descent
Burials at the Jewish cemetery on the Mount of Olives
20th-century American businesspeople
20th-century American philanthropists
20th-century American Jews
21st-century American Jews